Cai Shun (Chinese: 蔡顺; born 1 February 1991 in Wuhan, Hubei) is a Chinese football player.

Club career
Born in Wuhan, Cai joined Shandong Luneng Football Academy. In 2011, Cai Shun started his professional footballer career with Hangzhou Greentown in the Chinese Super League. In March  2011, he moved to China League One side Hubei Greenery on a one-year loan deal.

In June 2012, Cai transferred to China League One side Wuhan Zall. He would eventually make his league debut for Wuhan on 3 November 2013 in a game against Guangzhou Evergrande, coming on as a substitute for Kang Zhenjie in the 80th minute.

In 2015, Cai signed for Hainan Seamen.

Club career statistics

References

1991 births
Living people
Chinese footballers
Footballers from Hubei
Zhejiang Professional F.C. players
Wuhan F.C. players
Hunan Billows players
Kunshan F.C. players
Chinese Super League players
China League One players
China League Two players
Association football defenders